Straußfurt is a municipality in the Sömmerda district of Thuringia, Germany. The former municipality Henschleben was merged into Straußfurt in December 2019.

References

Sömmerda (district)